The Blonay–Chamby railway line is a  railway line in the canton of Vaud, Switzerland. The line is owned by Transports Montreux–Vevey–Riviera (MVR), who use the line to move rolling stock between the Vevey - les Pleiades line and the Montreux Oberland Bernois line. the Blonay–Chamby Museum Railway operates shuttle trains with historic rolling stock over the route at weekends between May and October. It was originally built by the Chemins de fer électriques Veveysans (CEV).

History 
The line was electrified from opening. The CEV ceased operations between Blonay and Chamby on 21 May 1966. The line was not abandoned, and the Blonay–Chamby Museum Railway began operations over the route on 20 July 1968.

Notes

References

External links 
 2022 timetable

Railway lines in Switzerland
Metre gauge railways in Switzerland
Transport in the canton of Vaud
Railway lines opened in 1902
900 V DC railway electrification